Siege of Warsaw (1656) – by Swedish forces during Deluge 
 Siege of Warsaw (1657) – by Swedish and Transylvanian forces during Deluge 
 First siege of Warsaw (1794) – by Russian and Prussian forces during Kościuszko Uprising 
 Second siege of Warsaw (1794) – by Russian forces during Kościuszko Uprising 
 Siege of Warsaw (1831) – by Russian forces during November Uprising
 Siege of Warsaw (1939) – by German forces during Invasion of Poland